The Scottish Women's Football League Cup, previously known as the Scottish Women's League Cup and Scottish Women's Football League First Division Cup, is a Scottish women's football competition founded in 1972. It is open only to teams in the Scottish Women's Football League (SWFL). It was the top-level league cup until 2002.

The SWFL Cup is played at present as the league cup of level 4 clubs in the SWFL, now a standalone amateur league tier. Teams at levels 1–3 now play for the SWPL Cup and SWF Championship Cup, following a reorganisation of the system in 2019.

Background
The trophy started out as the Scottish Women's League Cup. The competition began in the 1972–73 season along with the foundation of the Scottish Women's League. Westthorn United won the first edition of the competition, as part of a treble along with the Scottish Women's League and Scottish Women's Cup.

High street store Sports Connection became the first official sponsor of the Scottish Women's League and Scottish Women's League Cup in 1997. Premier Division clubs broke away to form a new top division, the Scottish Women's Premier League (SWPL), before the 2002–03 season. The Scottish Women's Premier League Cup, a competition only open to SWPL teams was also introduced. With the top division in Scotland now having its own exclusive League Cup competition, the existing competition became the equivalent to the men's Scottish Challenge Cup, only open to lower league clubs.

In 2012, Scottish Women's Football launched separate cup competitions for its First and Second Division teams, and the top trophy became exclusively for teams in the First Division, the national second league tier (which became the third tier in 2016, below SWPL 2). From 2009, women's football in Scotland adopted a summer season running from March to November each year.

Following the 2019 reorganisation, the SWFL First and Second Divisions ceased to exist as they had. A new equivalent knockout tournament for the new Championship, the SWF Championship Cup, was introduced. The older trophy became the Scottish Women's Football League Cup, open to clubs playing at that 'Recreational' level. The 2021 competition was played as a straight knockout cup, won by Bishopton, but the 2022 cup had a group phase. From this, the top teams qualified for the knockout stage, while eliminated clubs competed for the SWFL Plate.

SWFL Second Division Cup
The Scottish Women's Football League Second Division Cup was played from 2012 to 2019, and was only open to teams in the four groups of the Scottish Women's Football League Second Division (Central, East, North and West). Representing level 3 (2012–2015) and then level 4 (2016–2019), it was the league cup for the lowest tier at that time in the women's football league system.

The tournament consisted of six rounds, including the final. All matches were played over only one leg. With between 40 and 50 teams entering, only some teams took part in the first round. The winners met the remainder in the second round, a standard last-32 knockout.

The league reconstruction in 2020 introduced a new SWF Championship division (and cup), along similar lines to the SWFL First Division, while the teams below formed a standalone 'Recreational' setup, continuing the SWFL name and the format of regional groups. The First Division Cup again became the SWFL League Cup, but with no second tier below the new SWFL groups, the Second Division Cup was discontinued.

List of winners 
The Scottish Women's League Cup competition began in season 1972–73.

1972 to 2002 
From 1972 to 2002, the cup was a competition open to all league clubs.

Note: Details incomplete

2002 to 2011 
From 2002 to 2011, the cup was open to all league clubs below the Premier League, i.e. in the SWFL First Division, Second Division and (initially) Third Division.

2012 to 2019 
Scottish Women's Football League First Division Cup:

Scottish Women's Football League Second Division Cup:

2020–present 
Since 2020, the cup has been a competition for all SWFL clubs. The previous two tiers were merged into one (below the SWF Championship). The 2020 competition was not completed due to the COVID-19 pandemic. The SWFL Plate was introduced in 2021 for clubs knocked out in the SWFL Cup group phase.

Scottish Women's Football League Cup:

Scottish Women's Football League Plate:

See also
Scottish Women's Cup
Scottish Women's Premier League Cup
SWF Championship Cup

References

External links
Football League Cup at Scottish FA
Scotland (Women) - List of Cup Winners at RSSSF

3
Scottish Women's Football League
1972 establishments in Scotland
Recurring sporting events established in 1972